The Tengizi Islands (also Tengiz Islands) are an archipelago in Korgalzhyn District, Akmola Region, Kazakhstan.

It is formed by roughly 70 small and medium-sized islands. These form a compact cluster off the deeply indented eastern shore of the lake.

Ecology
The Tengizi Islands are part of the Korgalzhyn Nature Reserve.

References

Lake islands of Kazakhstan
Ramsar sites in Kazakhstan